Ridlington is a village and former civil parish, now in the parish of Witton, in the North Norfolk district, in the county of Norfolk, England.
The nearest airport is Norwich International Airport. The civil parish was merged into Witton on 1 April 1935. In 1931 the civil parish had a population of 180.

Description
The village of Ridlington is in the eastern part of the large parish of Witton. The name Ridlington is thought to derive from the Old English for Hrethel’s people’s enclosure. The village is surrounded by land largely in arable use. Many of the fields were owned by a single landowner, John Owles.

The Domesday Book
Ridlington has an entry in the Domesday Book of 1085 where its population, land ownership and productive resources were extensively detailed along with the other settlement of Witton In the survey Ridlington is recorded by the name of Ridlinketuna, in the hundred of Tunstead. The main tenants being Ranulf brother of Ilger. The survey also indicate the presence of a priest in Witton. Despite the evidence for Saxon activity in Witton, the settlement does not appear to have been particularly populous or valuable, and Ridlington even less so. Despite the mention of a priest, there is no listing of a church or chapel in the settlements.

Gallery

References

External links

Villages in Norfolk
Former civil parishes in Norfolk
North Norfolk